was a Japanese noble of the Nara period. He was the third son of the sangi Fujiwara no Umakai, the founder of the Fujiwara Shikike. He held no court ranks or titles.

Genealogy 
Father: Fujiwara no Umakai
Mother: , daughter of 
Wife: daughter of 
Son: Fujiwara no Tanetsugu (737-785)
Other children:
, possibly instead a son of Tanetsugu
, court lady of Emperor Kanmu

Notes 

Fujiwara clan
716 births
777 deaths
People of Nara-period Japan